The Papal States, officially the State of the Church, were a series of territories in the Italian Peninsula under the direct sovereign rule of the pope from 756 until 1870. They were among the major states of Italy from the 8th century until the unification of Italy, between 1859 and 1870.

The state had its origins in the rise of Christianity throughout Italy, and with it the rising influence of the Christian Church. By the mid-8th century, with the decline of the Byzantine Empire in Italy, the Papacy became effectively sovereign. Several Christian rulers, including the Frankish kings Charlemagne and Pepin the Short, further donated lands to be governed by the Church. During the Renaissance, the papal territory expanded greatly and the pope became one of Italy's most important secular rulers as well as the head of the Church. At their zenith, the Papal States covered most of the modern Italian regions of Lazio (which includes Rome), Marche, Umbria and Romagna, and portions of Emilia. These holdings were considered to be a manifestation of the temporal power of the pope, as opposed to his ecclesiastical primacy.

By 1861, much of the Papal States' territory had been conquered by the Kingdom of Italy. Only Lazio, including Rome, remained under the pope's temporal control. In 1870, the pope lost Lazio and Rome and had no physical territory at all, except St. Peter's Basilica and the papal residence and related buildings around the Vatican quarter of Rome, which the new Italian state did not occupy militarily, despite annexation of Lazio. In 1929 the Italian Fascist leader Benito Mussolini, the head of the Italian government, ended the "Prisoner in the Vatican" problem involving a unified Italy and the Holy See by negotiating the Lateran Treaty, signed by the two parties. This treaty recognized the sovereignty of the Holy See over a newly created international territorial entity, a city-state within Rome limited to a token territory which became the Vatican City.

Name
The Papal States were also known as the Papal State (although the plural is usually preferred, the singular is equally correct as the polity was more than a mere personal union). To some extent the name used varied with the preferences and habits of the European languages in which it was expressed.

History

Origins

For its first 300 years, within the Roman Empire, the Church was persecuted and unrecognized, unable to hold or transfer property. Early congregations met in rooms set aside for that purpose in the homes of well-to-do individuals, and a number of early churches, known as titular churches and located on the outskirts of ancient Rome, were held as property by individuals, rather than by the Church itself. Nonetheless, the properties held nominally or actually by individual members of the Roman churches would usually be considered as a common patrimony handed over successively to the legitimate "heir" of that property, often its senior deacons, who were, in turn, assistants to the local bishop. This common patrimony attached to the churches at Rome and thus, under its ruling bishop, became quite considerable, including as it did not only houses etc. in Rome or nearby but landed estates, such as latifundia, whole or in part, across Italy and beyond.

This system began to change during the reign of the Emperor Constantine I, who made Christianity lawful within the Roman Empire and restored to it any properties that had been confiscated; in the larger cities of the empire this would have been quite considerable, and the Roman patrimony not least among them. The Lateran Palace was the first significant new donation to the Church, most probably a gift from Constantine himself.

Other donations followed, primarily in mainland Italy but also in the provinces of the Roman Empire. However, the Church held all of these lands as a private landowner, not as a sovereign entity. Following the fall of the Western Roman Empire, the papacy found itself increasingly placed in a precarious and vulnerable position. As central Roman authority disintegrated throughout the late 5th century, control over the Italian peninsula repeatedly changed hands, falling under Arian suzerainty during the reign of Odoacer and, later, the Ostrogoths. The Church organization in Italy, with the pope at its head, submitted of necessity to their sovereign authority, while asserting its spiritual primacy over the whole Church.

The seeds of the Papal States as a sovereign political entity were planted in the 6th century. Beginning in 535, under Emperor Justinian I, the Eastern Roman Empire – referred to by most historians as the Byzantine Empire to distinguish the Greek-speaking and religiously Byzantine polity based in Constantinople from the Latin-speaking, Roman Catholic Empire ruled from Rome – launched the Gothic War to reconquer Italy. This lasted until 554 and devastated Italy's political and economic structures. Then in 568 the Lombards entered the peninsula from the north, establishing their own Italian kingdom, and over the next two centuries would conquer most of the Italian territory recently regained by Byzantium. By the 7th century, Byzantine authority was largely limited to a diagonal band running roughly from Ravenna, where the emperor's representative, or Exarch, was located, to Rome and south to Naples, plus coastal exclaves. North of Naples, the band of Byzantine control contracted, and the borders of the "Rome-Ravenna corridor" were extremely narrow.

With effective Byzantine power weighted at the northeast end of this territory, the pope, as the largest landowner and most prestigious figure in Italy, began by default to take on much of the ruling authority that the Byzantines were unable to exercise in the areas surrounding the city of Rome. While the popes legally remained “Roman subjects” under Byzantine authority, in practice the Duchy of Rome, an area roughly equivalent to modern-day Latium, became an independent state ruled by the pope.

The Church's independence, aided by popular support for the papacy in Italy, enabled various popes to defy the will of the Byzantine emperor: Pope Gregory II even excommunicated Emperor Leo III during the Iconoclastic Controversy. Nevertheless, the pope and the exarch still worked together to check the rising power of the Lombards in Italy. As Byzantine power weakened, though, the papacy assumed an ever-larger role in protecting Rome from the Lombards, but lacking direct control over sizable military assets, the Pope relied mainly on diplomacy to achieve as much. In practice, these papal efforts served to focus Lombard aggrandizement on the exarch and Ravenna. A climactic moment in the founding of the Papal States was the agreement over boundaries embodied in the Lombard King Liutprand's Donation of Sutri (728) to Pope Gregory II.

Donation of Pepin

When the Exarchate of Ravenna finally fell to the Lombards in 751, the Duchy of Rome was completely cut off from the Byzantine Empire, of which it was theoretically still a part. The popes renewed earlier attempts to secure the support of the Franks. In 751, Pope Zachary had Pepin the Short crowned king in place of the powerless Merovingian figurehead king Childeric III. Zachary's successor, Pope Stephen II, later granted Pepin the title Patrician of the Romans. Pepin led a Frankish army into Italy in 754 and 756. Pepin defeated the Lombards – taking control of northern Italy – and made a gift (called the Donation of Pepin) of the properties formerly constituting the Exarchate of Ravenna to the pope.

In 781, Charlemagne codified the regions over which the pope would be temporal sovereign: the Duchy of Rome was key, but the territory was expanded to include Ravenna, the Duchy of the Pentapolis, parts of the Duchy of Benevento, Tuscany, Corsica, Lombardy, and a number of Italian cities. The cooperation between the papacy and the Carolingian dynasty climaxed in 800 when Pope Leo III crowned Charlemagne as 'Emperor of the Romans'.

Relationship with the Holy Roman Empire

The precise nature of the relationship between the popes and emperors – and between the Papal States and the Empire – is disputed. It was unclear whether the Papal States were a separate realm with the pope as their sovereign ruler, merely a part of the Frankish Empire over which the popes had administrative control, as suggested in the late-9th-century treatise Libellus de imperatoria potestate in urbe Roma, or whether the Holy Roman emperors were vicars of the pope (as a sort of archemperor) ruling Christendom, with the pope directly responsible only for the environs of Rome and spiritual duties.

Events in the 9th century postponed the conflict. The Holy Roman Empire in its Frankish form collapsed as it was subdivided among Charlemagne's grandchildren. Imperial power in Italy waned and the papacy's prestige declined. This led to a rise in the power of the local Roman nobility, and the control of the Papal States during the early 10th century passed to a powerful and corrupt aristocratic family, the Theophylacti. This period was later dubbed the Saeculum obscurum ("dark age"), and sometimes as the "rule by harlots".

In practice, the popes were unable to exercise effective sovereignty over the extensive and mountainous territories of the Papal States, and the region preserved its old system of government, with many small countships and marquisates, each centred upon a fortified rocca.

Over several campaigns in the mid-10th century, the German ruler Otto I conquered northern Italy; Pope John XII crowned him emperor (the first so crowned in more than forty years) and the two of them ratified the Diploma Ottonianum, by which the emperor became the guarantor of the independence of the Papal States. Yet over the next two centuries, popes and emperors squabbled over a variety of issues, and the German rulers routinely treated the Papal States as part of their realms on those occasions when they projected power into Italy. As the Gregorian Reform worked to free the administration of the church from imperial interference, the independence of the Papal States increased in importance. After the extinction of the Hohenstaufen dynasty, the German emperors rarely interfered in Italian affairs. In response to the struggle between the Guelphs and Ghibellines, the Treaty of Venice made official the independence of the Papal States from the Holy Roman Empire in 1177. By 1300, the Papal States, along with the rest of the Italian principalities, were effectively independent.

Avignon Papacy

From 1305 to 1378, the popes lived in the papal enclave of Avignon, surrounded by Provence and under the influence of the French kings. This period was known as the "Avignonese" or "Babylonian Captivity". During this period the city of Avignon itself was added to the Papal States; it remained a papal possession for some 400 years even after the popes returned to Rome, until it was seized and incorporated into the French state during the French Revolution.

During the Avignon Papacy, local despots took advantage of the absence of the popes to establish themselves in nominally papal cities: the Pepoli in Bologna, the Ordelaffi in Forlì, the Manfredi in Faenza, and the Malatesta in Rimini all gave nominal acknowledgment to their papal overlords and were declared vicars of the Church.

In Ferrara, the death of Azzo VIII d'Este without legitimate heirs (1308) encouraged Pope Clement V to bring Ferrara under his direct rule: however, it was governed by his appointed vicar, King Robert of Naples, for only nine years before the citizens recalled the Este from exile (1317); interdiction and excommunications were in vain: in 1332 John XXII was obliged to name three Este brothers as his vicars in Ferrara.

In Rome itself the Orsini and the Colonna struggled for supremacy, dividing the city's rioni between them. The resulting aristocratic anarchy in the city provided the setting for the fantastic dreams of universal democracy of Cola di Rienzo, who was acclaimed Tribune of the People in 1347, and met a violent death in early October 1354 as he was assassinated by supporters of the Colonna family. To many, rather than an ancient Roman tribune reborn, he had become just another tyrant using the rhetoric of Roman renewal and rebirth to mask his grab for power. As Prof. Guido Ruggiero states, "even with the support of Petrarch, his return to first times and the rebirth of ancient Rome was one that would not prevail."

The Rienzo episode engendered renewed attempts from the absentee papacy to re-establish order in the dissolving Papal States, resulting in the military progress of Cardinal Albornoz, who was appointed papal legate, and his condottieri heading a small mercenary army. Having received the support of the archbishop of Milan and Giovanni Visconti, he defeated Giovanni di Vico, lord of Viterbo, moving against Galeotto Malatesta of Rimini and the Ordelaffi of Forlì, the Montefeltro of Urbino and the da Polenta of Ravenna, and against the cities of Senigallia and Ancona. The last holdouts against full papal control were Giovanni Manfredi of Faenza and Francesco II Ordelaffi of Forlì. Albornoz, at the point of being recalled, in a meeting with all the Papal vicars on 29 April 1357, promulgated the Constitutiones Sanctæ Matris Ecclesiæ, which replaced the mosaic of local law and accumulated traditional 'liberties' with a uniform code of civil law. These Constitutiones Egidiane mark a watershed in the legal history of the Papal States; they remained in effect until 1816. Pope Urban V ventured a return to Italy in 1367 that proved premature; he returned to Avignon in 1370 just before his death.

Renaissance
During the Renaissance, the papal territory expanded greatly, notably under the popes Alexander VI and Julius II. The pope became one of Italy's most important secular rulers as well as the head of the Church, signing treaties with other sovereigns and fighting wars. In practice, though, most of the Papal States were still only nominally controlled by the pope, and much of the territory was ruled by minor princes. Control was always contested; indeed it took until the 16th century for the pope to have any genuine control over all his territories.

Papal responsibilities were often in conflict. The Papal States were involved in at least three wars in the first two decades of the 16th century. Julius II, the "Warrior Pope", fought on their behalf.

Reformation
The Reformation began in 1517. In 1527, before the Holy Roman Empire fought the Protestants, troops loyal to Emperor Charles V brutally sacked Rome and imprisoned Pope Clement VII, as a side effect of battles over the Papal States. Thus Clement VII was forced to give up Parma, Modena, and several smaller territories. A generation later the armies of King Philip II of Spain defeated those of Pope Paul IV over the same issues.

This period saw a gradual revival of the pope's temporal power in the Papal States. Throughout the 16th century, virtually independent fiefs such as Rimini (a possession of the Malatesta family) were brought back under Papal control. In 1512 the state of the church annexed Parma and Piacenza, which in 1545 became an independent ducate under an illegitimate son of Pope Paul III. This process culminated in the reclaiming of the Duchy of Ferrara in 1598, and the Duchy of Urbino in 1631.

At its greatest extent, in the 18th century, the Papal States included most of central Italy – Latium, Umbria, Marche and the Legations of Ravenna, Ferrara and Bologna extending north into the Romagna. It also included the small enclaves of Benevento and Pontecorvo in southern Italy and the larger Comtat Venaissin around Avignon in southern France.

Napoleonic era

The French Revolution affected the temporal territories of the Papacy as well as the Roman Church in general. In 1791 an election in Comtat Venaissin and Avignon was followed by occupation by Revolutionary France. Later, with the French invasion of Italy in 1796, the Legations (the Papal States' northern territories) were seized and became part of the Cisalpine Republic.

Two years later, French forces invaded the remaining area of the Papal States, and in February 1798 General Louis-Alexandre Berthier declared a Roman Republic. Pope Pius VI fled from Rome to Siena and died in exile in Valence in 1799. The French Consulate restored the Papal States in June 1800, and the newly elected Pope Pius VII took up residence in Rome, but in 1808 the French Empire under Napoleon invaded again, and this time on 17 May 1809 the remainder of the States of the Church were annexed to France, forming the départements of Tibre and Trasimène.

Following the fall of the Napoleonic system in 1814, the Congress of Vienna formally restored the Italian territories of the Papal States, but not the Comtat Venaissin or Avignon, to Vatican control.

Upon restitution of sovereignty to the Papal States, Pius VII decided to abolish feudalism, transforming all the noble titles (temporarily abolished during the Napoleonic occupation) into honorifics disconnected from territorial privileges. In 1853, Pius IX put an end to the centuries-old duality between the papal nobility and the Roman baronial families by equating the civic patriciate of the city of Rome with the nobility created by the Pope.

From 1814 until the death of Pope Gregory XVI in 1846, the popes followed a reactionary policy in the Papal States. For instance, the city of Rome maintained the last Jewish ghetto in Western Europe. There were hopes that this would change when Pope Pius IX (in office 1846–1878) succeeded Gregory XVI and began to introduce liberal reforms.

Italian unification

Italian nationalism had been stoked during the Napoleonic period but dashed by the settlement of the Congress of Vienna (1814–15), which sought to restore the pre-Napoleonic conditions: most of northern Italy was under the rule of junior branches of the Habsburgs and the Bourbons. The Papal States in central Italy and the Bourbon Kingdom of the Two Sicilies in the south were both restored. Popular opposition to the reconstituted and corrupt clerical government led to numerous revolts, which were suppressed by the intervention of the Austrian army.

The nationalist and liberal revolutions of 1848 affected much of Europe. In February 1849 a Roman Republic was declared, and the hitherto liberally-inclined Pope Pius IX had to flee the city. The revolution was suppressed with French help in 1849 and Pius IX switched to a conservative line of government. Until his return to Rome in 1850, the Papal States were governed by a group of cardinals known as the Red Triumvirate.

As a result of the Austro-Sardinian War of 1859, Sardinia-Piedmont annexed Lombardy, while Giuseppe Garibaldi overthrew the Bourbon monarchy in the south. Afraid that Garibaldi would set up a republican government, the Piedmont government petitioned French Emperor Napoleon III for permission to send troops through the Papal States to gain control of the south. This was granted on the condition that Rome be left undisturbed.

In 1860, with much of the region already in rebellion against Papal rule, Sardinia-Piedmont conquered the eastern two-thirds of the Papal States and cemented its hold on the south. Bologna, Ferrara, Umbria, the Marches, Benevento and Pontecorvo were all formally annexed by November of the same year. While considerably reduced, the Papal States nevertheless still covered the Latium and large areas northwest of Rome.

A unified Kingdom of Italy was declared and in March 1861 the first Italian parliament, which met in Turin, the old capital of Piedmont, declared Rome the capital of the new Kingdom. However, the Italian government could not take possession of the city because a French garrison in Rome protected Pope Pius IX.

The opportunity for the Kingdom of Italy to eliminate the Papal States came in 1870; the outbreak of the Franco-Prussian War in July prompted Napoleon III to recall his garrison from Rome and the collapse of the Second French Empire at the Battle of Sedan deprived Rome of its French protector.

King Victor Emmanuel II at first aimed at a peaceful conquest of the city and proposed sending troops into Rome, under the guise of offering protection to the pope. When the pope refused, Italy declared war on 10 September 1870, and the Italian Army, commanded by General Raffaele Cadorna, crossed the frontier of the papal territory on September 11 and advanced slowly toward Rome.

The Italian Army reached the Aurelian Walls on September 19 and placed Rome under a state of siege. Although the pope's tiny army was incapable of defending the city, Pius IX ordered it to put up more than token resistance to emphasize that Italy was acquiring Rome by force and not consent. This incidentally served the purposes of the Italian State and gave rise to the myth of the Breach of Porta Pia, in reality, a tame affair involving a cannonade at close range that demolished a 1600-year-old wall in poor repair. The defence of Rome was not however bloodless, with 12 dead and 47 wounded amongst the Papal forces and 32 dead plus 145 wounded of the Italian troops. 

Pope Pius IX ordered the commander of the papal forces to limit the defence of the city in order to avoid bloodshed. The city was captured on 20 September 1870. Rome and what was left of the Papal States were annexed to the Kingdom of Italy as a result of a plebiscite the following October. This marked the definite end of the Papal States.

Despite the fact that the traditionally Catholic powers did not come to the pope's aid, the papacy rejected the 1871 "Law of Guarantees" and any substantial accommodation with the Italian Kingdom, especially any proposal which required the pope to become an Italian subject. Instead, the papacy confined itself (see Prisoner in the Vatican) to the Apostolic Palace and adjacent buildings in the loop of the ancient fortifications known as the Leonine City, on Vatican Hill. From there it maintained a number of features pertaining to sovereignty, such as diplomatic relations since in canon law these were inherent in the papacy.

In the 1920s, the papacy – then under Pius XI – renounced the bulk of the Papal States. The Lateran Treaty with Italy (then ruled by the National Fascist Party under Benito Mussolini) was signed on 11 February 1929, creating the State of the Vatican City, forming the sovereign territory of the Holy See, which was also indemnified to some degree for loss of territory.

Regional governors 

As the plural name Papal States indicates, the various regional components retained their identity under papal rule. The pope was represented in each province by a governor, who bore one of a number of titles. These included "papal legate", as in the former principality of Benevento, or at Bologna, in Romagna, and the March of Ancona; and "papal delegate", as in the former duchy of Pontecorvo and in the Campagne and Maritime Province. Other titles like "Papal Vicar", "Vicar General", and also several titles of nobility, such as "count" or even "prince" were used. However, throughout the history of the Papal States, many warlords and even bandit chieftains controlled cities and small duchies without having received any title from the Pope of the day.

Papal military
Historically the Papal States maintained military forces composed of volunteers and mercenaries, including Catholic military orders. Between 1860 and 1870 the Papal Army (Esercito Pontificio in Italian) comprised two regiments of locally recruited Italian infantry, two Swiss regiments and a battalion of Irish volunteers, plus artillery and dragoons.
In 1861 an international Catholic volunteer corps, called Papal Zouaves after a kind of French colonial native Algerian infantry, and imitating their uniform type, was created. Predominantly made up of Dutch, French and Belgian volunteers, this corps saw service against Garibaldi's Redshirts, Italian patriots, and finally the forces of the newly united Italy.

The Papal Army was disbanded in 1870, leaving only the Palatine Guard, which was itself disbanded on 14 September 1970 by Pope Paul VI; the Noble Guard, which also disbanded in 1970; and the Swiss Guard, which continues to serve both as a ceremonial unit at the Vatican and as the pope's protective force.

A small Papal Navy was also maintained, based at Civitavecchia on the west coast and Ancona on the east. With the fall of the Papal States in 1870, the last ships of the flotilla were sailed to France, where they were sold after the death of Pius IX.

See also 

Captain General of the Church
Donation of Constantine
History of Rome
Index of Vatican City-related articles
Italian United Provinces
Roman Question
Unification of Italy
War of the Eight Saints

References

Citations

Sources 

Chambers, D.S. 2006. Popes, Cardinals & War: The Military Church in Renaissance and Early Modern Europe. I.B. Tauris. .

Luther, Martin (1521). Passional Christi und Antichristi . Reprinted in W.H.T. Dau (1921). At the Tribunal of Caesar: Leaves from the Story of Luther's Life. St. Louis: Concordia. (Google Books)

External links 

Papal States Coinage
WHKMLA Historical atlas: here the page offering numerous links to maps of/containing Italy

 
History of Rome
States and territories established in the 750s
States and territories disestablished in 1798
States and territories established in 1799
States and territories disestablished in 1809
States and territories established in 1814
States and territories disestablished in 1849
States and territories established in 1849
States and territories disestablished in 1870
Christian states
Christendom
1870 disestablishments in the Papal States
Former theocracies
History of Catholicism in Italy
History of the papacy
8th-century establishments in the Papal States
754 establishments
Former monarchies of Europe